Hired Wife is a 1934 American drama film directed by George Melford and starring Greta Nissen, Weldon Heyburn and James Kirkwood. It was produced as a second feature by the independent company Pinnacle Productions. It was shot at the Sun Haven Studios in Florida rather than in Hollywood. Location shooting took place at the Soreno Hotel in St. Petersburg, Florida.

Cast
 Greta Nissen as Vivian Mathews
 Weldon Heyburn as 	Kent Johns
 James Kirkwood as Philip Marlowe
 Molly O'Day as 	Pat Sullivan
 Jane Winton as Dovie Jansen
 Blanche Taylor as 	Mrs. Jansen
 Carolyn Gales as 	Aunt Mancha
 Evelyn Bennett as 	Celeste
 Johnnie Lee a s	Hotel Bellboy
 Bob Miller as Hotel Bellboy
 James Peters as Airport Truck Driver
 Patricia Jean Worthington as 	Party Guest

References

Bibliography
 Pitts, Michael R. Poverty Row Studios, 1929–1940. McFarland & Company, 2005.
 Wollstein, Hans J. Strangers in Hollywood: the history of Scandinavian actors in American films from 1910 to World War II. Scarecrow Press, 1994.

External links
 

1934 films
1934 drama films
1930s English-language films
American drama films
Films directed by George Melford
Films shot in Florida
1930s American films